"Too Hot to Touch" is a song by Australian glam rock band Supernaut, released in released in September 1976 as the second and final single from the band's debut studio album, Supernaut (1976). The song peaked at number 14 on the Australian Kent Music Report.

Track listing 
7" (Polydor 2079 091)
 Side A "Too Hot to Touch" - 3:58
 Side B "Lick My Lolly" - 3:36

Charts

References 

1976 songs
1976 singles
Polydor Records singles